Cho Gun-woo (Hangul: 조건우; born 30 August 1988) is a South Korean badminton player from Samsung Electro-Mechanics, and joined the club since 2007.

Cho Gun-woo has focused his career on men's doubles, although he has competed in mixed doubles. His longest partnership was with Kwon Yi-goo staying together for most of the 2011 season, but his most successful run was at the 2012 Malaysia Super Series with Shin Baek-cheol. He has also competed with Kim Min-seo in mixed doubles.

Achievements

Asian Championships 
Men's doubles

BWF World Junior Championships 
Boys' doubles

Asian Junior Championships 
Boys' doubles

BWF Superseries 
The BWF Superseries, which was launched on 14 December 2006 and implemented in 2007, is a series of elite badminton tournaments, sanctioned by the Badminton World Federation (BWF). BWF Superseries levels are Superseries and Superseries Premier. A season of Superseries consists of twelve tournaments around the world that have been introduced since 2011. Successful players are invited to the Superseries Finals, which are held at the end of each year.

Men's doubles

  BWF Superseries Finals tournament
  BWF Superseries Premier tournament
  BWF Superseries tournament

BWF Grand Prix 
The BWF Grand Prix had two levels, the BWF Grand Prix and Grand Prix Gold. It was a series of badminton tournaments sanctioned by the Badminton World Federation (BWF) which was held from 2007 to 2017.

Men's doubles

Mixed doubles

  BWF Grand Prix Gold tournament
  BWF Grand Prix tournament

BWF International Challenge/Series 
Men's doubles

Mixed doubles

  BWF International Challenge tournament
  BWF International Series tournament

Record against selected opponents 
Men's doubles results with Shin Baek-cheol against Superseries Final finalists, Worlds Semi-finalists, and Olympic quarterfinalists.

  Chai Biao & Guo Zhendong 1–0
  Fang Chieh-min & Lee Sheng-mu 0–2
  Markis Kido & Hendra Setiawan 0–1
  Ko Sung-hyun & Yoo Yeon-seong 0–1
  Koo Kien Keat & Tan Boon Heong 0–1
  Howard Bach & Tony Gunawan 1–0

References

External links 
 

1988 births
Living people
Sportspeople from South Jeolla Province
South Korean male badminton players